Barnet Fire Station is located in Station Road, New Barnet, London. It was opened in 1993. A previous station in nearby Leicester Road closed in 1992 and was demolished in 2005.

References

External links

Fire stations in the United Kingdom
New Barnet
Buildings and structures in the London Borough of Barnet
Buildings and structures completed in 1993